is a Japanese manga series written and illustrated by Kenya Suzuki. The manga is licensed in English by Seven Seas Entertainment. A 12 episode short-form anime series adaptation by Feel aired from January to March 2016.

Characters

The main character of the series, who despite her name and appearance, is very inexperienced and innocent, and gets easily embarrassed over her physique and what she says, as she sometimes accidentally says suggestive stuff. She has difficulty waking up early, but becomes more active as the day passes. She is also very emotional and becomes easily involved when reading books or watching movies, to the point of crying. She enjoys cooking, and usually makes her own bentos, and can even make bread. She is also terrified of body modifications such as piercings, despite having earrings. She also has an older sister, with whom she often exchanges clothes, including her school uniform; she gets angry, however, after finding out just what her sister does with it. Her name refers to gyaru subculture in Japan.

One of Galko's friends, an otaku with glasses who likes to mock Galko and gets constantly annoyed by her inability to wake up early. She likes to tell and ask Galko especially about suggestive topics. Between classes, Otako prefers to sit quietly and read. At home she watches anime based on her brother's recommendations.

Another of Galko's friends, who is a proper lady from a rich family. She is friendly and somewhat of an airhead.

One of Galko's classmates, a blond boy who is outgoing, popular, and tends to tease Galko. He is the vocalist and bassist of the school's light music club.

One of Galko's classmates and Charao's friends. He is the tallest boy at his class. He's a regular at the school's baseball team, and is very careful but proud about his haircut.

One of Galko's classmates and Charao's friends. A shy otaku boy with glasses who has a crush on Galko. He is shown to be a closet pervert.

Another of Galko's classmates, a very plump girl with glasses. She is a member of the girl's futsal team, nicknamed "Sonic Meat" by the boys because she's very fast despite her weight.

Galko's homeroom teacher.

Galko's very tall classmate who has a bad posture due to her height, and is also interested in the occult. The boys start stalking her after they learn from Galko that she also has big breasts.

The class president of Galko's class with a serious personality. Her name translates literally into "class president".

Galko's quiet classmate who was initially annoyed by her, but warms slightly to her after she changes his eye-covering hairstyle. He earned his nickname from Charao after coming to school with bed hair, and Galko fixed his hair for him. He buys beauty products and starts using that as his regular hairstyle, and appears to have developed a crush on her.

Galko's classmate who is very tomboyish. She is often shown talking with Iinchou. Her name translates literally into "Prince".
Galko's sister

Galko's older sister, who has tanned skin and even bigger breasts than Galko's. She also has a boyfriend, with whom she has engaged in sexual roleplay while wearing her sister's uniform, much to Galko's disgust upon finding out.

Manga
Kenya Suzuki originally began publishing the series on Twitter, but it was moved to Kadokawa's ComicWalker website on 27 June 2014. As of November 2015, the manga had been viewed over one million times. The series is licensed for publication in North America by Seven Seas Entertainment.

On 20 December 2021, Suzuki was arrested on suspicion of importing child pornography from Germany. Four days later, Kadokawa responded by suspending the serialisation of the manga. On 29 March 2022, Suzuki was sentenced to one year and two months in prison, suspended for three years.

Volumes

Anime
An anime television series written and directed by Keiichiro Kawaguchi and animated by the animation studio Feel. Kenji Fujisaki provided the series' character designs. The opening theme song is performed by the voice actresses for the three main characters. It consisted of twelve 7 minute episodes.

The series premiered on 8 January 2016 as part of Ultra Super Anime Time on Tokyo MX, BS11, and AT-X. Crunchyroll simulcasted the series worldwide outside of Asia.

An original video animation was bundled with a special edition of the fourth manga volume, which was released on 23 January 2017.

Episode list

References

External links
  
  
  
 

Anime series based on manga
Comedy anime and manga
Crunchyroll anime
Feel (animation studio)
Gyaru in fiction
Kadokawa Dwango franchises
Kadokawa Shoten manga
Seinen manga
Seven Seas Entertainment titles
Slice of life anime and manga